Gorakhpur division is an administrative geographical unit of Uttar Pradesh state in northern India. Gorakhpur is the administrative headquarters of the division. Currently (2017), the division consists of four districts:

Districts 
 Gorakhpur
 Deoria
 Kushinagar
 Maharajganj

History
In the year 1801, the region was transferred by the Nawab of Avadh to the East India Company and Gorakhpur was raised to the status of a district.  In 1829, Gorakhpur was made the headquarters of a Division of the same name, comprising the districts of Gorakhpur, Ghazipur and Azamgarh. Mr. R.M. Biad was first appointed Commissioner.

Nowadays, Gorakhpur has become a hub for readymade garments and also known for Terracotta.

At present, Azamgarh is a separate division lying south of Gorakhpur division, while the present day Ghazipur district is part of Varanasi Division and Ballia district which was carved out of Ghazipur is now included in Azamgarh division.

References

 
Divisions of Uttar Pradesh